This is a list of fictional bears that appear in video games, film, television, animation, comics and literature. This also includes pandas, but not the unrelated red panda species. The list is limited to notable, named characters. This list is a subsidiary to the List of fictional animals article.

Animation

Comics

Film and television

Literature

Video games

Mascots
Avalanche the Golden Bear, the official mascot of the Golden Bears of Kutztown University of Pennsylvania
Bananas T. Bear, the official mascot of the University of Maine
Bandabi, the mascot of the 2018 Winter Paralympic games 
Bely Mishka, one of 3 mascots of the 2014 Winter Olympics
Berlino, the mascot of the 2009 World Championships in Athletics
Billy Bob Brockali, was the mascot of ShowBiz Pizza Place and was the bass & vocals of the band for the show The Rock-afire Explosion before it re-branded to Chuck E. Cheese's.
Bing Dwen Dwen, the mascot of the 2022 Winter Olympics
Blue, the official mascot of Labatt Brewing Company
Boomer, the official mascot of Lake Forest College
Boomer, the official mascot of Missouri State University
Broxi Bear, official mascot of Rangers Football Club
Bruiser, the official mascot of Baylor University
Bruiser, the official mascot of Belmont University
Bruno, the official mascot of Brown University
Brutus the Bruin Bear, the official mascot Salt Lake Community College
Bundy R. Bear, official mascot of Bundaberg Rum
The Care Bears, greeting card mascots
Carlton the Bear, the official mascot of the Toronto Maple Leafs
The Charmin Bears, the mascot family of bears for Charmin
Clark, official team mascot of the Chicago Cubs
Clutch, the official mascot for the Houston Rockets
Coca-Cola polar bears, mascots of the Coca-Cola Company
Coal, one of 3 mascots of the 2002 Winter Olympics
Comet, the official mascot of Concordia University
Cooper, the official mascot for the West Virginia Black Bears
Cresta, the official mascot for Cresta
General, the official mascot of Georgia Gwinnett College
George, the bear in the British Hofmeister Beer commercials of the 1980s. "For great lager, follow the bear"
Golden Bear, the official mascot for Miles College
Golden Bear, the official mascot for Western New England University
The Gomdoori, 2 Asian black bear mascots of the 1988 Summer Paralympic games
Griz, the official mascot for Franklin College
Grizz Also Super Grizz, from the Memphis (Vancouver) Grizzlies
Grizz, official mascot of Oakland University
Grizzlies, official mascot of Adams State University
Grizzly, official mascot of Butler Community College
The Grupo Bimbo mascot
Hamm's Beer bear and its wife, Harley bear
Hidy, one of 2 mascots of the 1988 Winter Olympics
Howdy, one of 2 mascots of the 1988 Winter Olympics
The Icee Company Bear
Jazz Bear, the official mascot of the Utah Jazz
John Lewis bear, mascot for the 2013 Christmas Advert by the John Lewis chain of department stores in Great Britain.
Jingjing, one of 5 mascots of the 2008 Summer Olympics
Klawz Da Bear, the official mascot of the University of Northern Colorado
Kumamon, mascot of Kumamoto Prefecture, Japan
Max C Bear, the official mascot of the State University of New York at Potsdam
Miga, one of 3 mascots of the 2010 Winter Olympics
Misha, the mascot of the 1980 Summer Olympics
Monte, the official mascot of the University of Montana
Nanook, one of two mascots for the Edmonton Eskimos
NYIT Bear, the official mascot of the New York Institute of Technology
Objee, the official mascot of the United States Coast Guard Academy
Oski the Bear, the official mascot of the University of California, Berkeley
Parker T. Bear, the mascot for the Fresno Grizzlies
Phineas T. Brizzly, the mascot for Brizzly
Polar Bear, the official mascot of Fox's Glacier Mints
Polar Bear, the official mascot of the Bowdoin College
Polar Bear, the official mascot of the Ohio Northern University
Polar Bear, the official mascot of the University of Alaska Fairbanks. AKA Nanook
Pom-Bear, the teddy shaped potato snack mascot
Populoso, the official mascot of the Puerto Rico Islanders
Pudsey Bear, the official mascot of Children in Need
Ranger D. Bear, the official mascot of the University of Wisconsin–Parkside
Scotty the Bear, the official mascot of the University of California, Riverside
Smokey Bear, mascot of the U.S. Forest Service, based on a real orphaned bear cub also named Smokey
Snuggle, the fabric softener bear (known as Coccolino in other regions)
Staley Da Bear, the official mascot of the Chicago Bears
Sugar Bear, mascot for General Foods Corporation's Post Sugar Crisp cereal
T. C., the official mascot for the Minnesota Twins
The Great Root Bear and its wife, Rosie Bear - Corporate mascots for A&W Root Beer
Toby, the official mascot of Mercer University
Touchdown, the official mascot of Cornell University. AKA Cornell Big Red
United Buddy Bears initiated by Klaus and Eva Herlitz
Victor E. Bear, the official mascot of the University of Central Arkansas

Myth and folklore
Callisto
Drop bear
Golden Bear
Jambavan
Jean de l'Ours
Nandi bear
Otso
Ungnyeo
Ursa Major
Ursa Minor
Field Bear

Other
The animatronic cast of the Country Bear Jamboree attraction, found at Walt Disney World's Magic Kingdom and Tokyo Disneyland
Beach Bear, was the guitar and vocals of the band for the show The Rock-afire Explosion before it re-branded to Chuck E. Cheese's.
Boof, a teddy bear belly heart in Suzy's Zoo
Choo-choo, a baby black bear that was part of the Rock-afire Explosion. He doesn't speak and would just pop out of his tree stump and bounce up and down to the music.
Cleo deCap, a character from sci-fi comedy Narrative Play podcast Backwater Bastards. Cleo was originally a human whose consciousness was later transferred into an ursine alien species.

Duffy, originally created for and briefly sold at the Disney World Once Upon a Toy shop in Orlando in 2002 but now can be found at the Tokyo Disney Resort, Disneyland and Disney California Adventure Park in California, Walt Disney World in Florida, Hong Kong Disneyland and Disneyland Paris, is Mickey's huggable bear
Fuzzy Wuzzy, subject of a well-known rhyme of the same name
Gloomy Bear, character from Japanese graphic designer Mori Chack. Gloomy, an abandoned little bear, is rescued by Pitty, a little boy. At first, he is cute and cuddly, but becomes more wild as he grows up. Since bears do not become attached to people like dogs by nature, Gloomy attacks Pitty even though he is the owner.
Gund Snuffles is a plush bear developed and produced by the GUND toy company and was the recipient of 1996 Oppenheim Toy Portfolio Award.
Pedobear is an Internet meme that became popular through the imageboard 4chan. As the name suggests ("pedo" being short for "pedophile"), it is portrayed as a pedophilic bear. It is a concept used to mock pedophiles or people who have any sexual interest in children or jailbait. The bear image has been likened to bait, used to lure children or as a mascot for pedophiles

References

Notes

Bears
Bears
Bears, fictional